The House of Fayez (Arabic: الفايز or, colloquially: Al-Fayez, Alfayez, Al Fayez, Al Faiz, Al Fayiz) is a noble sheikhly Jordanian family that heads the major Jordanian clan Bani Sakher. The family's influence and prominence in the region was at its ultimate under Fendi Al-Fayez, who led the family in the 1840s and gradually became the leader of the entire Bani Sakher. Fendi would rule large parts of Jordan and Palestine, including the ancient Kingdoms of Moab and Ammon, and parts of modern-day Saudi Arabia until the late 1860s when a series of battles with the Ottoman Empire decreased the family's resources and claimed a portion of its holdings. After Fendi, his young son Sattam led the tribe in a push to cultivate the lands and live a more sedentary lifestyle, then under Mithqal Alfayez as a permanent political power in modern Jordan. The family was the largest owner of land in Jordan and owned portions of modern day Palestine, and Mithqal was the single largest owner of private land in the kingdom in 1922. The Al-Fayez family is active in Jordanian and Arabian politics and is currently headed by former Prime Minister Faisal Al-Fayez.

History 
The Al-Fayez family came from the Bani Sakher tribe that originated from the Arabian Banu Tayy Tribe which itself originated from the Qahtanites in Yemen, and the Bani Sakher were first mentioned in text in the 15th century AD. The origin of the name is from the progenitor of the house, Fayez bin Fadel Al-Tayy. Fayez is derived from the Arabic word Fa'iz, meaning "Victorious" in Arabic. The Bani Sakher Tribe was separated from Banu Tayy during that time as they migrated north to modern day Jordan, and then the Fayez were further distinguished after multiple successful leaders from the family and furthermore the lineage of Fayez Al-Tayy.

The family was briefly split in 1879 when Emir Fendi died of illness on his way back from Nablus. During that time, half of his eight remaining sons allied with the Adwan tribe who were Bani Sakher's adversaries, and the other half under Sheikh Satm allied with the Anazah tribe. In May of 1881 Sheikh Satm was killed in a skirmish with the Adwan, leading to the reunification of the tribe by Sattam bin Fendi in September 1881, to regain some of the influence that his father had on the area. However those two years would prove to be a big loss for the Fayez family as they never recovered to the peak that they experienced under Fendi.

18th Century 
In 1742, Sheikh Qa'dan Al-Fayez, the progenitor of the Qa'dan branch of the Al-Fayez family and the grandson of Fayez Al-Tay, was invited to support the Ottoman state in Sieging Tiberias. Although the siege was a failure, the Beni Sakher were still thanked by an invite from As'ad Pasha al-Azm to escort the Hajj Caravans. In 1757, the Ottoman state failed to pay the Beni Sakher for their services, this coupled with the drought of 1756 has led to the infamous raid in 1757 led by Qa'dan. The raid's casualties were in the tens of thousands, including Musa Pasha and the sister of the sultan.

19th Century 
In 1820, Fendi Al-Fayez led in battle for the first recorded time, and by mid century he was the paramount sheikh and revered throughout Arabia.

One of the most famous conflicts that they had was against the Majalli family in 1863 and was documented by the Italian explorer Carlo Claudio Camillo Guarmani in his book that Northern Nejd. The Al Tafilah villagers, who were subject to Mohammad Al-Majalli, paying yearly tributes to him, were discontented with the recent negligence of the Majalis in protecting the villagers. The Tafilah villagers were gathered by Abdullah Al-Huara, the chief of the Tafilah, and agreed to renounce vassalage and replace the tribute with an annual gift as homage instead. The Al-Majalli chief was discontent with this and was ready to force the Tafilah's to become their vassals again, but was stopped by the Bani Sakher headed by Fendi, where Fendi sent Shleesh Al-Bakhit Al-Fayez to ensure the contract between them where both parties comprised to avoid bloodshed. 

However, in January 1864, Al-Majalli again decided to attack and announce himself the master of the Tafilah, and was met with an immediate declaration of war from Fendi himself. Shleesh Al-Bakhit was successful in leading an attack against Qoblan Al-Mkheisen who was appointed by Al-Majalli to oversee the Tafilah. Fendi shortly after sent 200 who met a force of 2000 riflemen on dromedaries. However, during the long standstill, the people of Al-Kerak were virtually under siege and were quickly running out of food and becoming increasingly ill-content, sensing this, Al-Majalli secretly went to Fendi in the night to personally declare his surrender to him and agreed to pay reparations to all those wronged in the conflict, including reinstating Al-Huara's son as the Chief of Al-Tafilah.

In 1868, an Anglican missionary, F.A Klein, was accompanied by Sattam bin Fendi on Fendi's orders to show him the Mesha Stele, which was previously unknown to the western world. The stone has been dated to 840BC and described a war between the ancient Kingdom of Moab and the ancient Kingdom of Israel. Today the stone can be found in the Louvre Museum, Paris.

20th Century 
After Sattam's death in 1891, another succession crisis unfolded with Sattam's son Fayez bin Sattam vying to succeed his father, in opposition to his uncle Talal bin Fendi. Talal was eventually recognized as Sheikh of Sheikhs of the Beni Sakher. The Ottomans invited both Fayez and Talal to Istanbul to arbitrate a reconciliation which was successful. During his visit Talal was conferred the title of Pasha with a monthly salary and would later become Belyerbey. During his 18-year reign, Talal enjoyed friendly relations with the Ottomans his last years with strains over the construction of the Hijaz Railway which not only crossed through many of the family's private lands but would also destroy their income as protectors of Hajj Caravans and providers of camels and supplies. Talal negotiated with the Ottomans, where they agreed to keep paying for the Hajj Caravans, and also pay the tribe for the protection of the Hijaz Railway. By 1908, Talal stopped receiving payments from the Ottomans, and his trip to Damascus to complain coincided with the beginning of the Young Turk revolution.

Talal would be succeeded by Fawaz bin Sattam in 1909, Mithqal's older brother. Fawaz who was recognized by the Ottomans as Sheikh of Shiekhs and would act as an official representative of the empire, would face a rebellious Mithqal who challenged Ottoman authority over cultivated fertile lands. By then, the new Ottoman administration was enacting new conscription laws that even included tribesmen. Mithqal's dropped his claim over the land after peaceful negotiations between the two parties and a settlement of 200 ewes to Mithqal. By 1913, Mithqal would act as Fawaz's right-hand man and military commander and would enjoy a portion of the leadership of the Beni Sakher. 

After Fawaz's death in 1917, his son Mashour who was had a Damascene education would succeed his father. Mashour was recognized by the Ottomans as Sheikh of Shiekhs, and Mithqal who was older was compensated by the Ottomans by the title of Pasha to become the last real Pasha in Jordan with a title sanctioned by the Sultan. In 1920, Mashour was recognized as the Governor of Jiza and would serve in the position till his death in a inter tribal battle in 1921. Mithqal who welcomed then Abdullah bin Hussein in Jiza, was recognized as Sheikh of Sheikhs of the Beni Sakher in the new Emirate of Transjordan with no opposition.

In 1923, during the Adwan rebellion, Mithqal Al-Fayez led the Beni Sakher against the Adwan and in full support of Emir Abdullah, with the result being the defeat of the Adwan forces with some taken as prisoners and exiled.

21st Century - present 
In 2004, H.E Faisal Al-Fayez became Prime Minister of Jordan.

In 2018, a member of the Al-Fayez family, Zaid Mohammad Sami Al-Fayez, was attacked in public by Emad Shawabkeh and 7 other assailants. The conflict was solved by tribal leaders from both sides and the assailants are in police custody.

In 2020, H.E Amer Trad Al-Fayez became President and Chairman of Al Abdali.

Heads of the House 
The Al-Fayez have customarily chosen a head of the house (Sheikh), usually conforming to the Bedouin custom of conferring the role to the eldest son (Albikir) of the current head, however throughout its long history there were some exceptions to this tradition. Note that the head of the Al-Fayez, would also be the head or co-head (with the head of the House of Khraisha) of the Bani Sakher clan as the Al-Fayez are the leading house in the clan.

Notable Figures 
17th Century: 

Fayez Bin Fadel (Progenitor) 
 Mouh Bin Fayez

18th Century:

 Muhammad Bin Mouh Al-Fayez
 Thiab Bin Mohammad Al-Fayez (Progenitor of the Thiab Branch)
 Bakhit Bin Thiab Al-Fayez (Progenitor of the Bakhit Branch)
 Qa'dan Bin Mouh Al-Fayez (Progenitor of the Qa'dan Branch)
 I'dbeys Bin Mouh Al-Fayez
 Nimer Bin I'dbeys Al-Fayez (Progenitor of the Nimer Branch)
 Mahmoud Bin I'dbeys Al-Fayez (Progenitor of the Mahmoud Branch)
 Awad Thiab Al-Fayez
 Abbas Awad Al-Fayez
Hamed Qa'dan Al-Fayez
Kin'eaan Qa'dan Al-Fayez (Progenitor of the Kin'eaan Branch)

19th Century:

 H.G Fendi Al-Fayez 
H.G Sattam Al-Fayez (Emir and Tribal Chief) 
H.G Nawaf Fendi Al-Fayez (Emir) 
Suleiman Awad Al-Fayez (Progenitor of the Abu-Jneib Branch) 
 Satm Fendi Al-Fayez (Tribal Chief)
 Sahan Fendi Al-Fayez (Judge)
Eid Suleiman Al-Fayez
Shleish Al Bakhit Al-Fayez 

20th Century:

 H.G Mithqal Al Fayez (Tribal Chief, Politician, Commander-In-Fighting)
H.G Talal Fendi Al-Fayez (Beylerbey and Tribal Chief)
H.G Fawaz Sattam Al-Fayez (Emir and Tribal Chief)
 H.E Akef Al-Fayez (Tribal Chief and politician)
Zaid Mithqal Al-Fayez (Senior Officer at the Prime Ministry) 
 Mashour Fawaz Al-Fayez (Tribal Chief)

20th Century - present:

 H.E Faisal Al-Fayez (Prime Minister, President of the Senate, Speaker of the House of Representatives)
H.E Amer Al-Fayez (Chairman of Al-Abdali, Chief of Royal Protocol, Ministerial rank)
 H.E Trad Al-Fayez (Minister of Agriculture, Ambassador, Senator)
H.E Eid Al-Fayez (Minister of Interior, State, and Labor)
 H.E Nayef Al-Fayez (Minister of Tourism, Chief Commissioner of ASEZA, Chairman of Aqaba Development Corporation)
H.E Nayef Hayel Al-Fayez (Minister of Health, MP)
H.E Daifallah Ali Al-Fayez (Ambassador of Jordan to the Netherlands and Estonia)
Sami Al-Fayez (Tribal Chief and Senator)
Tayil Al-Fayez (President of the Jordanian Olympic Club)
Mohammad Enad Al-Fayez (MP)
 Alanoud Al-Fayez (ex-wife of King ِAbdulaziz)
 Hakem Al-Fayez (Politician)
 Thamer Al-Fayez (MP)
 Hind Al-Fayez (MP)
 Habis Sami Al-Fayez (MP) 
 Bassam Al-Fayez (MP)

See also 

 Fendi Al-Fayez
 Mithqal Al Fayez
 Faisal Al Fayez
 Bani Sakher

References 

Jordanian families
Political families of Jordan
Dynasties
Families
Arab families
Tribes